J Lesser is the stage name for Jason Doerck (born December 19, 1970). Between 2003 and 2006 Doerck was a member of the defunct laptop group Sagan, alongside Blevin Blectum, Wobbly, and video artist Ryan Junell.

Early years 
Born and raised around California, including Willits and San Diego, Doerck began his music career listening to and playing bass guitar (as J.C Backstreet) for the three-piece ensemble Cradlestone RIP and the Sutter Valley Claimjumpers.  black metal and punk, including a Metallica cover band. In San Diego, he had a job coloring New Kids on the Block comic books using computers. In 1997, he helped form the group Disc with Kid606, M.C. Schmidt and Drew Daniel (of Matmos).

An interest in electronic music drove Doerck to begin work with record label Vinyl Communications in 1992, adding more electronic flavor to what was otherwise a punk record label. Doerck settled in the San Francisco Bay Area in 1994, where he participated in the drum & bass scene. There he toured with A Minor Forest, and later collaborated with Kid606, publishing a number of records on the label Tigerbeat6. Doerck also played with members of Crash Worship. Doerck's early electronic music influences included Luke Vibert's work released under the alias Plug, which Doerck admits he tried to imitate (with little success).

2000s 
In 2001, Doerck became a live/touring member of Matmos when they toured as an opening act with Björk in addition to playing as supporting musicians in her band on the Vespertine tour. During the same year, his album Gearhound won an Honorable Mention for Digital Musics in the Prix Ars Electronica.

In 2001, Doerck released an MP3  compilation of Lesser material on CD entitled LS-MP3CD-R that included hundreds of files and over 12 hours of audio. 

In 2004, Doerck remixed "Who Is It" from Björk's Medúlla album.

Discography 
 I Hate Me (Cassette, 1990)
 Split 7" with bigblackMariah (Hate Posse Records, 1991)
 VC-39 (Vinyl Communications, 1992)
 I Hate Me (Endless Records, 1993)
 The 1995 Lesser / Rob Crow Split CD (Vinyl Communications, 1995)
 Excommunicate The Cult Of The Live Band (Vinyl Communications, 1996)
 Welcome To The American Experience (Vinyl Communications, 1997)
 Gigolo Cop (Vinyl Communications, 1997)
 Elements of Pessimism, vol.1 (Box Theory Records, 1998)
 Lesser / Kid606 Split CD (Vinyl Communications, 1998)
 Gearhound (Matador Europe, 2001)
 MENSA Dance Squad (Tigerbeat6, 2001)
 LS-MP3CD-R (Tigerbeat6, 2002)
 Suppressive Acts: I-X (Matador Europe, 2003)

References

External links 
 
 
 Jay Lesser on Matador Records
 Golden, Barbara. “Conversation with J Lesser).” eContact! 12.2 — Interviews (2) (April 2010). Montréal: CEC.
 Hood, Stu. Interview with J Lesser. SHZine (1 October 2002).

Living people
American electronic musicians
1970 births
People from Willits, California